Watterson can refer to several different things.

People
 Bill Watterson, creator of the comic strip: Calvin and Hobbes
 Henry Watterson, journalist
 John Ambrose Watterson, Roman Catholic bishop
 Juan Watterson, Isle of Man politician
 Mike Watterson (1942–2019), English snooker player
 Peter Watterson, Catholic priest

Places
Canada
 Watterson Corners, Ontario
United States
 Watterson Park, Kentucky

Other
 Watterson estimator
 Bishop Watterson High School, Columbus, Ohio, US
 The Henry Watterson Expressway (I-264), a highway in Louisville, Kentucky, US
 Watterson Towers, a 28-story student residence hall complex at Illinois State University, US
 The Watterson family from the animated show The Amazing World of Gumball

See also
 Waterson (disambiguation)